Mounds View High School is a public high school located in Arden Hills, Minnesota, United States. A part of the Mounds View Public Schools district, the high school is located in a suburban area approximately nine miles north of downtown Minneapolis and Saint Paul and includes seven cities with 76,193 residents. As of 2014–15 the school had an enrollment of 1735, with a student/teacher ratio of 21.81. The school's enrollment by race/ethnicity breaks down as follows: Asian 13.2%; Black 3.6%; Hispanic 2.6%; White 79.2%; Other 1.4%. It includes grades 9–12 and was founded in 1955. It is one of two high schools that are in the Mounds View Public school district (621), the other being Irondale High School. Most residents of Mounds View, Minnesota, actually attend Irondale High School.

Academics and recognition 
95% of students feel supported by their teachers and 92% feel respected by their fellow students.  Mounds View High School was named among the best high schools in the nation by U.S. News & World Report (top 15 in the state) for exceeding expectations when it comes to student performance on reading & math tests, and for preparing students for college. The average ACT score at Mounds View High School is 25.4 (2016) compared to the Minnesota state average of 21.1. 99% of the class takes the ACT exam.

Activities and sports 

 Adaptive Athletics
 Anime Club
 Art Club
 Baseball
 Basketball*
 Clay Target Club
 Cross Country*
 Dance Team
 DECA
 Diversity Council
 Drama
 Drone Club
 Econ Team
 Euro Challenge
 National Economics Challenge
 Personal Finance Decathlon
 Startup MV
 Investment Team
 Football
 Foreign Language Club
 French Club
 German Club
 Golf*
 Gymnastics
 Hockey*
 Lacrosse*
 Math Team
 Mock Trial
 Music: various band, choir, and orchestra ensembles
 Mustang Mentors
 Newspaper – Class (Mounds View Viewer)
 Peer Helpers
 Photo Club
 Quiz Bowl
 Robotics
 Science Bowl
 Science Olympiad
 Skiing (Nordic and Alpine)
 Skills USA
 Soccer*
 Softball
 Spanish Club
 Speech
 Student Council
 Swimming*
 Synergy
 Tennis*
 Track*
 USA Biology Olympiad club
 UNICEF Club
 Volleyball
 Volunteer Club
 Weight Training
 Wrestling
 Yearbook – Class

* Designates activities that offer both a boys' team and a girls' team.
Source:

Notable alumni
Sydney Brodt, ice hockey player for the PWHPA and the American national team
Kate Brown, governor of Oregon
Kelly Catlin, Olympian for Rio 2016
Kyra Condie, Olympian for 2020 Summer Olympics in Tokyo, professional rock climber
Mark Hamburger, professional baseball player
Sam Hentges, professional baseball player
 Nick Horvath, professional basketball player
 Mark Landsberger, professional basketball player
 Rob McClanahan, professional hockey player
 Seth Rosin, professional baseball player
Chris Stedman, author 
 Billy Turner, professional football player
 Adam Weber, professional football player
 Yishan Wong, former CEO of Reddit and former Director of Engineering at Facebook

See also
List of high schools in Minnesota

References

External links
 

Public high schools in Minnesota
Educational institutions established in 1955
Schools in Ramsey County, Minnesota
1955 establishments in Minnesota